Streamer is a radiative transfer code (Key and Schweiger, 1988) to calculate radiances (intensities) or irradiances in the atmosphere.

The code uses N-stream approximation to the radiative transfer equations (Stamnes et al. 1988) and allows for flexible choice of bands. The code can be used both for satellite radiance applications and estimates of heating rates in both cloudy and non-cloudy atmosphere. One can specify surface reflectivity.  Streamer is written in FORTRAN.

FluxNet
FluxNet, the neural network version of Streamer, calculates upwelling and downwelling surface flux in either shortwave or longwave.  It is less flexible than Streamer but is two to four times faster.

See also
 List of atmospheric radiative transfer codes
 Atmospheric radiative transfer codes
 DISORT

References

 Key, J. and A.J. Schweiger, 1998, Tools for atmospheric radiative transfer: Streamer and FluxNet, Computers & Geosciences, 24(5), 443-451.
 Stamnes, K., S. Tsay, W. Wiscombe and K. Jayaweera, 1988: Numerically stable algorithm for discrete-ordinate-method radiative transfer in multiple scattering and emitting layered media. Appl. Opt., 27, 2502-2509.

External links
 Streamer home page
 FluxNet home page

Atmospheric radiative transfer codes